The Armament Research & Development Establishment (ARDE) is a laboratory of the Defence Research and Development Organisation (DRDO). Located in Pune, it is the main DRDO lab involved in the development of conventional armaments.

History 

ARDE was established in 1958, with the goal of achieving self-sufficiency in the field of Armaments. ARDE started working from a rudimentary facility within the campus of Ammunition Factory, Khadki of the Ordnance Factory Board. Personnel were drawn from the erstwhile Technical Development Establishment (Weapons) located in Jabalpur and Technical Development Establishment (Ammunition) at Khadki of the Indian Ordnance Factories.

In 1966, ARDE moved to its present location at Pashan, on the outskirts of Pune, next to the National Chemical Laboratory, a major CSIR Laboratory.

Areas of work 

ARDE's main area of research is in the design and development of Conventional Armaments for the Indian Armed Forces. This stretches over the whole gamut of research, development, prototyping, test and evaluation, and transfer of technology activities. This includes basic and applied research, modeling, simulation and software development of armaments. Additionally, life extension and upgradation of in-Service equipment is also carried out.

Being a research laboratory, ARDE does not carry out large-scale production activities, except for limited scale pilot-plant production of crucial items. After an initial production, the technologies developed by it are transferred to manufacturing agencies like BEL, OFB and other manufacturers. In this capacity, ARDE supervises the Transfer of Technology to these plants, and aids in initial productionization and Quality Assurance of these products.

With the Indian Armed Forces using many weapons from foreign vendors, it is necessary to integrate them and make them compatible with other existing systems in service. ARDE is involved in advising the Services regarding induction and indigenisation of Weapon Systems of Foreign Origin.

Projects and products 
Brief List of some of the projects and products which are and were undertaken by ARDE are as follows

Small arms

7.62×51 1A1 self loading rifle

One of the earlier ARDE developments was the 7.62 mm 1A1 self-loading rifle (SLR) and its ammunition which replaced the Ishapore 2A1 bolt-action rifles (based on the 0.303 Lee–Enfield rifle) in Indian Army service then. Over a million rifles have been produced by the Rifle Factory Ishapore, and were used in the 1965 and 1971 Indo-Pakistan Wars.

INSAS 5.56 mm small arms family

Drawing heavily from its past experience with the 7.62mm SLR, ARDE developed the 5.56 mm Indian Small Arms System (INSAS). This helped standardize ammunition for infantry, reducing logistical problems. The infantry was earlier equipped with three types of small arms firing two types of ammunition, viz. 7.62 mm Ishapore SLR, LMG and 9 mm carbine. The INSAS family replaces all the three weapons, and consists of an Assault Rifle, a Light Machine Gun, and a Carbine Variant. The INSAS was introduced in 1998, and has since supplanted the SLR as the service rifle of the Indian Army.

ARDE 40 mm under barrel grenade launcher
The single shot ARDE 40 mm under barrel grenade launcher was developed in collaboration with Ordnance Factory Tiruchirappalli for use with the INSAS and AK-47 rifles. Stand alone versions of the grenade launcher also exist. The UBGL has an in-built safety to prevent accidental firing and a 3-point attachment for rigidity. The trigger system is, located on the side of the barrel, allowing the soldier to fire both the rifle and grenade launcher without having to change his firing posture. The weapon uses a simple ladder sight mechanism and has tritium illuminated sights for night firing. The ammunition fired by the UBGL, is similar to the Milkor MGL used by the Indian Army, allowing for standardisation.

ASMI machine pistol 
India's first indigenous machine pistol Asmi was jointly developed by the Indian Army and ARDE.

Artillery and tank guns

105 mm Indian Field Gun
Designed by ARDE in 1972, the Indian Field Gun.It became the mainstay of the army's field artillery after being introduced.

Pinaka multi barrel rocket launcher
The Pinaka multi barrel rocket launcher was developed by the DRDO for the Indian Army. Development began in 1983. The Army had felt the need for a weapon system which could neutralize targets at ranges exceeding 30 km. To meet this demand, Pinaka MBRLS was developed. The project was a major program involving several DRDO Labs, Public and Private Sector Firms. This was one of the first major projects involving the Private sector. L&T and Tata have been given orders worth Rs. 390 crores

The system comprises a free-flight artillery rocket with different types of warheads & fuzes, a multi-tube launcher vehicle, a replenishment-cum-loader vehicle, a replenishment vehicle and a command post vehicle. The system is capable of firing in salvo mode within 48 sec, neutralizing an area of 700 x 500 m. The Pinaka was successfully used in Kargil War against Fortified Pakistani Positions in the mountains. The Army has placed an order for 6 regiments, with one already operational.

Arjun 120 mm gun

The Arjun MBT's 120 mm main gun is a rifled gun developed and tested by ARDE for use with the Arjun tank. The gun is one of the few rifled tank guns in modern tanks (the Challenger 2 Tank also uses a rifled gun). It is capable of firing rounds at velocities over 1650 m/s, and can sustain pressures of up to 612 MPa.

ARDE has also developed the Ammunition system for the gun, with FSAPDS being the primary kinetic energy round used. The Arjun can also use HEAT, HESH and other rounds, as well as being able to fire the LAHAT Anti-tank missile The armament and ammunition system are under current production at OFB.

DRDO 155 mm artillery gun
A DRDO project to develop a 155 mm 52 calibre indigenous howitzer.

Ejection seat 
ARDE has developed an ejection seat for LCA HAL Tejas military aircraft. The British Martin-Baker ejection seat used for initial prototype is planned to be replaced with a locally developed alternative. To improve pilot safety during ejection, the Armament Research and Development Establishment (ARDE), Pune, India created a new line-charged canopy severance system, which has been certified by Martin-Baker.

Robotics

Daksh robot

Daksh is an electrically powered and remotely controlled robot used for locating, handling and destroying hazardous objects safely.

References

External links 
 ARDE Home Page
 Pinaka MBRL System on GlobalSecurity.org.
 
 

Defence Research and Development Organisation laboratories
Research institutes in Pune
1958 establishments in Bombay State
Research institutes established in 1958